Anuradha Biswal (born 28 March 1975) is an Indian former track and field athlete from Odisha who specialized in 100 metre hurdles. She previously held the national record of 13.38 seconds for 100 m hurdles, set on 26 August 2002 during the DDA-Raja Bhalendra Singh National Circuit meet held at the Nehru Stadium in Delhi. She bettered her own record of 13.40 seconds clocked at the Asian championships in Jakarta on 30 July 2000. She held the record until Jyothi Yarraji ran 13.23s on 10 May 2022. She won a bronze medal for her performance in Jakarta. She is working with NALCO in Bhubaneswar, Odisha.

International competitions

References

External links
 

1975 births
Living people
People from Balasore
Athletes from Odisha
Sportswomen from Odisha
Indian female hurdlers
Athletes (track and field) at the 2002 Asian Games
Athletes (track and field) at the 2010 Commonwealth Games
South Asian Games gold medalists for India
Asian Games competitors for India
South Asian Games medalists in athletics
Commonwealth Games competitors for India
21st-century Indian women
21st-century Indian people